Günther's flat-tail gecko (Uroplatus guentheri) is a species of nocturnal gecko, a lizard in the family Gekkonidae. The species is endemic to Madagascar.

Etymology
The specific name, guentheri, is in honour of German-born British herpetologist Albert Günther.

Geographic range
U. guentheri is found in northwestern Madagascar in the area around Ankarafansika and near Morondava in western Madagascar.

Description

Habitat and behaviour
U. guentheri lives on small trees and bushes. It is very difficult to find during the day, using its camouflage to mimic dead branches and bits of bark. During the night however, it becomes active, hunting for invertebrate prey.

References

Further reading
Glaw F, Vences M (1994). A Fieldguide to the Amphibians and Reptiles of Madagascar, Second Edition. Cologne, Germany: Vences & Glaw Verlag / Serpents Tale. 480 pp. .
Mocquard F (1908). "Description de quelques Reptiles et d'un Batracien nouveaux de la collection du Muséum ". Bulletin du Muséum d'Histoire Naturelle, Paris 14: 259-262. ("Uroplatus Güntheri ", new species, pp. 259–260). (in French).

guentheri
Geckos of Africa
Reptiles of Madagascar
Endemic fauna of Madagascar
Taxa named by François Mocquard
Reptiles described in 1908